The BR postcode area, also known as the Bromley postcode area, is a group of eight postcode districts in England, within seven post towns. These cover part of south-eastern Greater London, as well as a small part of north-west Kent.

The area covers much of the London Borough of Bromley, as well as small parts of the London Borough of Lewisham, the Royal Borough of Greenwich and the London Borough of Croydon. Most of BR8 and a small part of BR6 cover the northwestern part of the Sevenoaks District of Kent, while BR8 also covers the hamlet of Clement Street in the borough of Dartford.

Mail for the area was sorted in Bromley until 1988, when this site was converted to a delivery office only.



Coverage
The approximate coverage of the postcode districts:

! BR1
| BROMLEY
| Bromley, Bickley, Downham, Sundridge
| Bromley, Lewisham
|-
!rowspan=2|BR2
| BROMLEY
| Hayes, Shortlands, Bickley, Bromley Common
|rowspan=2|Bromley
|-
| KESTON
| Keston, Keston Mark, Leaves Green, Nash
|-
! BR3
| BECKENHAM
| Beckenham, Elmers End, Shortlands, Eden Park, Park Langley, Clock House 
| Bromley, Lewisham, Croydon
|-
! BR4
| WEST WICKHAM
| West Wickham
| Bromley
|-
! BR5
| ORPINGTON
| Petts Wood, St Mary Cray, St Paul's Cray, Ruxley
| Bromley
|-
! BR6
| ORPINGTON
| Orpington, Locksbottom, Farnborough, Crofton, Green Street Green, Chelsfield, Downe, Pratt's Bottom, Well Hill
| Bromley, Sevenoaks
|-
! BR7
| CHISLEHURST
| Chislehurst, Elmstead
| Bromley, Greenwich
|-
! BR8
| SWANLEY
| Swanley, Hextable, Crockenhill, Swanley Village, Hockenden
| Sevenoaks, Bromley, Dartford
|}

Map

See also
List of postcode areas in the United Kingdom
Postcode Address File

References

External links
Royal Mail's Postcode Address File
A quick introduction to Royal Mail's Postcode Address File (PAF)

Media and communications in the London Borough of Bromley
Postcode areas covering London
Postcode areas covering South East England